Sand Hill Road, often shortened to just "Sand Hill" or "SHR", is an arterial road in western Silicon Valley, California, running through Palo Alto, Menlo Park, and Woodside, notable for its concentration of venture capital companies. The road has become a metonym for that industry; nearly every top Silicon Valley company has been the beneficiary of early funding from firms on Sand Hill Road.

Its significance as a symbol of private equity and venture capitalism in the United States is compared to that of Wall Street and the stock market, K Street in Washington, D.C. and political lobbying,  Madison Avenue for the advertising industry, or Harley Street in London, UK for private specialist medicine and surgery.

Location
Connecting El Camino Real and Interstate 280, the road provides easy access to Stanford University and the northwestern area of Silicon Valley. The road also runs southwest of Interstate 280 into a residential neighborhood of Woodside, California, but the private equity companies are concentrated to the east of the freeway on the main stretch of the road in Menlo Park.  On its northeast end, it crosses into and runs briefly through Palo Alto before ending at El Camino Real.

Sand Hill Road is also home to the SLAC National Accelerator Laboratory.

History

For many years, Sand Hill Road's northern end terminated in the middle of Stanford Shopping Center's parking lot, and the only four-lane segment was the section from Interstate 280 to Santa Cruz Avenue (the section where all the venture capitalists are housed). This situation resulted in two severe bottlenecks which made it difficult to travel to and from Stanford Shopping Center, Stanford University, and Menlo Park. 

Extension and widening of the road was fiercely opposed by environmentalists, who were concerned about the road's proximity to San Francisquito Creek, and by residents of Menlo Park, who feared that completion of the road would increase traffic congestion in their area due to the mid-Peninsula region's lack of a direct north-south arterial. After three decades of lobbying, negotiation, and litigation, the road was finally completed to El Camino Real in 2001. Only the existing portion from just north of Alameda de las Pulgas to just south of Stanford Shopping Center was widened to four lanes; the new extension past the shopping center was built only as two lanes.  

The project was delayed because the stretch of land at issue runs through Menlo Park, not Palo Alto; the city reversed its opposition to widening only after seeing the results of the widening of the northern Palo Alto segment.

Venture capitalism

The first venture capitalist to establish itself on Sand Hill Road was Kleiner Perkins Caufield & Byers in 1972. Since then, beneficiaries of funding from Sand Hill include Microsoft, Amazon.com, Facebook, Twitter, Instagram and Skype.

For several years during the dot-com boom of the late 1990s, commercial real estate on Sand Hill Road was more expensive than almost anywhere else in the world.  The annual rent in the area around Sand Hill Road peaked at around $144 (USD) per square foot ($1550 per m2) in mid-2000; at the time, this was higher than rates in Manhattan and London's West End.

In 1997, the Harvard Business School opened the California Research Center at 3000 Sand Hill Road, whose aim is to enable HBS faculty to write business cases about Silicon Valley.

As of December 2014, Sand Hill Road is still the most expensive office space in the United States with annual rent reported at $111 per square foot, which was higher than Manhattan's Fifth Avenue at $102 per square foot.

Venture capital firms 

Venture capital and private equity firms located on Sand Hill Road include:

In popular culture
The season two premiere episode of the HBO television series Silicon Valley, in which the show's protagonists try to secure venture capital for their startup, was titled "Sand Hill Shuffle".

In the movie Birdemic: Shock and Terror, protagonist Rod meets with the fictional "Evergreen Capital" on Sand Hill Road in hopes of getting funding for his solar panel startup.

In the second episode of her Netflix documentary series Chelsea Does, Chelsea Handler takes a helicopter trip over Sand Hill Road and visits with Geoff Yang, a founding partner of Redpoint Ventures, to try and understand Silicon Valley better.

References

External links 
 

Streets in Santa Clara County, California
Menlo Park, California
Silicon Valley
Streets in San Mateo County, California